Alexander von Humboldt II is a German sailing ship built as a replacement for the ship Alexander von Humboldt, which had been launched in 1906 and used for sail training since 1988. Constructed by Brenn- und Verformtechnik (BVT) in Bremen, the new ship was launched in 2011.

Just like her predecessor, the Alexander von Humboldt II is operated by Deutsche Stiftung Sail Training in Bremerhaven which offers sail training for people between 14 and 75 years of age.

See also
Alexander von Humboldt
Alexander von Humboldt (ship)
List of large sailing vessels

References

External links

 Official site 

Training ships of Germany
Barques
Tall ships of Germany
Individual sailing vessels
2011 ships
Ships built in Bremen (state)